Çavuşköy can refer to the following places in Turkey:

 Çavuşköy, Araç
 Çavuşköy, Bayramiç
 Çavuşköy, Enez
 Çavuşköy, Karayazı
 Çavuşköy, Karacabey
 Çavuşköy, Kastamonu
 Çavuşköy, Lapseki
 Çavuşköy, Manyas
 Çavuşköy, Mustafakemalpaşa
 Çavuşköy, Refahiye
 Çavuşköy, Sungurlu

See also
 Adrasan, Kumluca, also known as Çavuşköy